The canton of Thiers is an administrative division of the Puy-de-Dôme department, central France. Its borders were modified at the French canton reorganisation which came into effect in March 2015. Its seat is in Thiers.

It consists of the following communes:
 
Arconsat
Celles-sur-Durolle
Chabreloche
Dorat
Escoutoux
La Monnerie-le-Montel
Palladuc
Sainte-Agathe
Saint-Rémy-sur-Durolle
Saint-Victor-Montvianeix
Thiers
Viscomtat
Vollore-Montagne

References

Cantons of Puy-de-Dôme